Bro Park is a Thoroughbred horse racing venue located in Upplands-Bro Municipality, approximately 40 kilometres northwest of Stockholm city. It was inaugurated June 19, 2016, with around 10,000 visitors in the audience.

Background
In 2011, an agreement was signed to sell the land where Täby Racecourse was located to JM Bygg and Skanska, that intended to build 4,000 apartments on the land. The racing meets held at Täby were therefore in 2016 moved to the new facility at Bro Park.

References 

Thoroughbred racing venues in Sweden